Hybocodon is a genus of cnidarians belonging to the family Tubulariidae.

The genus has cosmopolitan distribution.

Species:

Hybocodon apiciloculatus 
Hybocodon atentaculatus 
Hybocodon chilensis 
Hybocodon cryptus 
Hybocodon octopleurus 
Hybocodon prolifer 
Hybocodon unicus

References

Tubulariidae
Hydrozoan genera